The 2022 Challenger Coquimbo II was a professional tennis tournament played on clay courts. It was part of the 2022 ATP Challenger Tour. It took place in Coquimbo, Chile between 17 and 23 October 2022.

Singles main-draw entrants

Seeds

 Rankings are as of 10 October 2022.

Other entrants
The following players received wildcards into the singles main draw:
  Diego Fernández Flores
  Matías Soto
  Daniel Vallejo

The following players received entry into the singles main draw as alternates:
  Román Andrés Burruchaga
  Juan Pablo Paz
  Thiago Seyboth Wild

The following players received entry from the qualifying draw:
  Rémy Bertola
  Sumit Nagal
  Jakub Paul
  Daniel Rincón
  Fermín Tenti
  José Francisco Vidal Azorín

Champions

Singles

 Juan Manuel Cerúndolo def.  Facundo Díaz Acosta 6–3, 3–6, 6–4.

Doubles

  Franco Agamenone /  Hernán Casanova def.  Karol Drzewiecki /  Jakub Paul 6–3, 6–4.

References

2022 ATP Challenger Tour
2022 in Chilean tennis
October 2022 sports events in Chile
Challenger Coquimbo